Miller Park is located at 2707 Redick Avenue in North Omaha, Nebraska. Bounded by Redick and Kansas Avenues on the north and south and 24th and 30th Streets on the east and west, respectively, the park was added to the city of Omaha in 1891.

History
Once called the "Pride of North Omaha," the park was established two years after George L. Miller failed to locate the Trans-Mississippi Exposition there. Miller was the first president of the Board of Park Commissioners, as well as the first doctor in Omaha, a major Democratic politician in Nebraska, and a major landowner in the city. The City of Omaha purchased it from the Parker heirs via a bond issue in 1891. 

In 1892, Miller Park was connected to the city by Omaha's Prettiest Mile Boulevard, which eventually led from Downtown Omaha to the park. That boulevard was part of a citywide system, which along with the park was designed by noted landscape architect H.W.S. Cleveland.

Pavilion
The Miller Park Pavilion is a noted three-story structure with a wrap-around covered porch with brick pillars and wooden railing. It has two château-looking A-frame end sections with a connecting middle section.

Present
Today the park also maintains the highly regarded Steve Hogan golf course, baseball fields, a playground, and a water park.

See also
 Parks in Omaha

References

External links
 "Evening in Miller Park", a historic postcard
 "Miller Park Lagoon", a historic postcard
 "Pavilion, Miller Park", a historic postcard

Parks in Omaha, Nebraska
History of North Omaha, Nebraska
1891 establishments in Nebraska